The 50th Anniversary Reunion Tour was a 2012 world concert tour by the American rock band the Beach Boys. The tour marked the first time since 1982 that founding member Brian Wilson had performed on a full tour with the band, although from 1965 to 1973 and again from 1983 to 1996 he did join them in select shows and appearances. The tour also marked the first time that The Beach Boys had played at the Hollywood Bowl since 1967, having sold it out both times.

Brian Wilson stated that this Beach Boys tour, and the album associated with it, That's Why God Made the Radio, which was released in June 2012, is dedicated to the memory of his two brothers: Carl who died of cancer in 1998, and Dennis, who drowned in 1983. The tour featured tributes to both brothers in which the band accompanied archival audio of vocals by Dennis ("Forever") and Carl ("God Only Knows").

Overview

The Beach Boys gave a performance and interview segment on SiriusXM which was aired on the sixties channel on May 26, 2012 during an entire four-day weekend devoted to the group. During the tour the band made various television appearances on their off days including an April 29, 2012 segment on CBS Sunday Morning, a multi-performances and an interview on Late Night with Jimmy Fallon on May 7, 2012 and a May 16, 2012 interview and a special one-hour performance on shopping channel QVC where they also promoted and sold copies of the new album. On May 18, 2012 the band appeared for an hour-long interview on Charlie Rose Show and performed on The Tonight Show with Jay Leno June 7, 2012. Throughout June and July, PBS aired a 90-minute performance by the band featuring footage from their May 2, 2012 show in Florida. On June 15, 2012, the same date they played a show in Maryland, the group appeared in New York on Good Morning America for an 8 A.M. performance.

The band also announced plans to release their 51-song performance from Red Rocks on DVD although nothing was officially confirmed.  One hour of live soundboard audio, primarily from the Grand Prairie, Texas performance, is available for free download on the National Public Radio web site.

Doin' It Again, an hour-long documentary which featured a new biography, new interviews with the band and footage from the tour and which also aired during the summer on PBS, was released on DVD and Blu-ray in August 2012. The Beach Boys Live in Concert: 50th Anniversary was released on DVD and Blu-ray in November 2012 and features a performance by the band from July 2012 in Phoenix, Arizona. The release featured a heavily edited performance which was cut down to sixty minutes and only twenty one of the fifty songs performed at the concert were featured leaving some fans angry that the full show wasn't released. A 41-song, 2-CD set titled Live – The 50th Anniversary Tour was released in May 2013.

Notable shows and guests
During the performance on May 8, 2012 at the Beacon Theater, Dennis' vocals malfunctioned on "Forever" shortly after the song began; John Stamos, who sang a remake of the number on Summer in Paradise, came on stage with a white towel around his neck, furthering the appearance that he was caught by surprise, to perform impromptu lead vocals.  Upon finishing, the crowd cheered approval, and many were heard screaming 'Uncle Jesse', referring to his days playing Jesse Katsopolis on the 1980s sitcom Full House.

During the group's June 2, 2012, show they were joined onstage by the group California Saga, which is an eight-piece group made up of the children of Brian, Carl and Dennis Wilson, Mike Love and Al Jardine. California Saga, which includes both Wendy Wilson and Carnie Wilson of the chart topping group, Wilson Phillips, joined the Beach Boys for a performance of "Friends" while Justyn Wilson (son of Carl) and Matt Jardine (son of Al) also joined on "All This is That" with Wilson singing his father's parts. The group also opened the June 3, 2012, show with a 20-minute set consisting of Beach Boys songs.

At the group's June 3, 2012, performance at the Verizon Wireless Amphitheater in Irvine, California, they were joined onstage for the last few songs by Dean Torrence, surviving member of Jan and Dean. Bruce Johnston stepped away from his keyboard to take photographs from the front of the stage of Torrence singing with The Beach Boys.

On June 13, 2012, Foster the People opened for the Beach Boys at Blossom Music Center, near Cleveland.  They also performed "Wouldn't It Be Nice" and other songs during the encore with the Beach Boys.

Ending controversy

Asked in May 2012, what the future holds beyond the tour, Mike Love stated that "We're looking at our present and future. I think we're going to be doing this again with Brian for a long time." Wilson said that he is already thinking of the next Beach Boys album, which he would make after the tour. "This time I would like to do some rock n' roll", Wilson said. "I would like it to be a bit harder and faster". In Love's 2016 memoir, he wrote that the end of the reunion came partly as a result from interference from Brian's wife and manager Melinda Ledbetter. Love added that during the performances, she attempted to install an autotune unit on each of the band members' microphones. This was the beginning of some backstage quarrels between Love and Ledbetter, which ended with his stipulating that she be banned from rehearsals until the tour was over.

Announcement
On June 1, 2012, Love received an e-mail from Ledbetter stating "no more shows for Wilson". Love, who is obligated by his license of the Beach Boys name to maintain revenue flow to Brother Records, then began accepting invitations for when the reunion was over. Johnston told reporter Mark Dillon in mid-June that the current tour was "a one-time event. You’re not going to see this next year. I'm busy next year doing my thing with Mike.” On June 25, Ledbetter sent another e-mail asking to disregard her last message, but by then, Love says, "it was too late. We had booked other concerts, and promoters had begun selling tickets." The next day, Love announced additional touring dates that would not feature Wilson. Wilson then denied knowledge of these new dates.

In July, Love stated, "There's talk of us going and doing a return to the Grammys next year, and there's talk about doing another album together. There's nothing in stone, but there's a lot of ideas being floated around. So after this year, after completing the 50th anniversary reunion, we'll entertain doing some more studio work and see what we can come up with and can do in the future." Love said that Wilson and producer Joe Thomas had over 80 hours of material recorded much of it culled from material they were working on around the time of Wilson's 1998 Imagination album that "were always songs he had earmarked for the Beach Boys." He further added that the label is stoked about what is happening and is pushing for more music and more tour dates.

Press furor
As scheduled, the band played their last show together on September 28, 2012. Love later wrote: "I had wanted to send out a joint press release, between Brian and me, formally announcing the end of the reunion tour on September 28. But I couldn't get Brian's management team on board (Brian himself doesn't make those kinds of decisions)." In late September, news outlets began reporting that Love had dismissed Wilson from the Beach Boys.

On October 5, Love responded in a self-written press release to the LA Times stating he "did not fire Brian Wilson from the Beach Boys. I cannot fire Brian Wilson from the Beach Boys ... I do not have such authority. And even if I did, I would never fire Brian Wilson from the Beach Boys." He explained that nobody in the band "wanted to do a 50th anniversary tour that lasted 10 years" and that its limited run "was long agreed upon". On October 9, Wilson and Jardine submitted a written response to the rumors stating: "I was completely blindsided by his press release ... We hadn't even discussed as a band what we were going to do with all the offers that were coming in for more 50th shows." Love responded in an interview that Wilson's statements in this press release were falsified by his agents.

Reflecting upon the band's reunion in 2013, Love stated: "I had a wonderful experience being in the studio together. Brian has lost none of his ability to structure those melodies and chord progressions ... Touring was more for the fans. ... It was a great experience, it had a term to it, and now everyone's going on with their ways of doing things." Biographer Jon Stebbins speculated that Love declined to continue working with the group because of the lesser control he had over the touring process, coupled with the lower financial gain, noting: "Night after night after night after night, Mike is making less money getting reminded that Brian is more popular than him. And he has to answer to people instead of calling all the shots himself." Writer Stacey Anderson called Love's arguments "wholly unconvincing", facetiously summarizing: "He insists that the larger ensemble with Wilson would have overpowered the modest venues he'd already booked; as anyone can infer, this really means he would have lost money by including Wilson."

Setlist
The set list for the tour, which varied from show to show, consisted of around 48 songs (with final shows reaching 50 or more songs), divided into two sets, an intermission and an encore. At least one song from every Beach Boys album was performed with the exception of songs from Friends, Love You, Keepin' the Summer Alive and Summer in Paradise. (The title track of Friends was performed during the June 2, 2012 show by California Saga, but nothing from the album was performed by the Beach Boys.) As stated before the tour, the two singles and "Summer's Gone" from That's Why God Made the Radio were performed, the latter at the two London shows at the end of the tour.

Songs performed

Surfin' Safari
 "409"
 "Surfin' Safari"

Surfin' U.S.A. (album)
 "Shut Down"
 "Surfin' U.S.A."

Surfer Girl
 "Catch a Wave"
 "Hawaii"
 "In My Room"
 "Little Deuce Coupe"
 "Surfer Girl"

Little Deuce Coupe
 "Ballad of Ole' Betsy"
 "Be True to Your School"

Shut Down Volume 2
 "Don't Worry Baby"
 "Fun, Fun, Fun"
 "Why Do Fools Fall in Love"

All Summer Long
 "All Summer Long"
 "Don't Back Down"
 "I Get Around"
 "Little Honda"
 "Wendy"

Beach Boys Concert
 "Johnny B. Goode" 

The Beach Boys Today!
 "Dance, Dance, Dance"
 "Do You Wanna Dance?"
 "Help Me, Rhonda"
 "Kiss Me, Baby"
 "Please Let Me Wonder"
 "When I Grow Up (To Be a Man)"

Summer Days (And Summer Nights!!)
 "California Girls"
 "Salt Lake City" 
 "Then I Kissed Her"
 "You're So Good to Me"
 "Let Him Run Wild"

Beach Boys' Party!
 "Barbara Ann"
 "There's No Other (Like My Baby)"

Pet Sounds
 "God Only Knows"
 "I Just Wasn't Made for These Times"
 "Pet Sounds"
 "Sloop John B"
 "Wouldn't It Be Nice"

Smiley Smile/Smile
 "Good Vibrations"
 "Heroes and Villains"

Wild Honey
 "Darlin'"

Friends
 "Friends" 

Best of The Beach Boys Vol. 3
 "The Little Girl I Once Knew"

20/20
 "Cotton Fields"
 "Do It Again"
 "Our Prayer"

Sunflower
 "Add Some Music to Your Day"
 "Forever"
 "This Whole World"

Surf's Up
 "Disney Girls (1957)"

Carl and the Passions – "So Tough"
 "All This Is That"
 "Marcella"

Holland
 "California Saga: California"
 "Sail On, Sailor"

15 Big Ones
 "It's O.K."
 "Rock and Roll Music"

M.I.U. Album
 "Come Go with Me"

L.A. (Light Album)
 "Good Timin'"

The Beach Boys
 "Getcha Back"

Made in U.S.A.
 "California Dreamin'"

Still Cruisin'
 "Kokomo"
 "Still Cruisin'"

That's Why God Made the Radio
 "Isn't It Time"
 "Summer's Gone"
 "That's Why God Made the Radio"

Miscellaneous
 "Rain" 

 California Saga, an eight-member group featuring the children of the Wilson brothers, Love and Jardine performed the song during the Beach Boys June 2, 2012 show.
 Performed for VIP Nation "ultimate VIP package" and "soundcheck package" ticket holders.
 Partially performed on 7/4/12 in Utah as an intro to "Fun, Fun, Fun".

Tour dates

Festivals and other miscellaneous performances
This concert was a part of the "New Orleans Jazz & Heritage Festival"
This concert was a part of the "Bonnaroo Music Festival"
This concert was a part of "Summerfest"
This concert was a part of the "Festival Internacional Sierra de Gredos"
This concert will be a part of the "Lokerse Festival"

Box office score data

Personnel
The Beach Boys

The five Beach Boys who participated in the reunion were founding 1961 members Brian Wilson, Mike Love, Al Jardine, 1962 addition David Marks and 1965 addition Bruce Johnston.

Founding members and Wilson's two younger brothers Dennis Wilson and Carl Wilson died in 1983 and 1998 respectively. They were both featured during the concerts, performing with pre-recorded vocals on video with the remainder of the band doing the harmonies live on stage.
 Brian Wilson – vocals, keyboards, occasional bass
 Mike Love – vocals, percussion
 Al Jardine – vocals, rhythm guitar
 Bruce Johnston – vocals, keyboards
 David Marks – vocals, lead guitar

Supporting musicians
 Jeff Foskett – guitar, mandolin, percussion, vocals
 Scott Totten – Musical Director, guitar, bass, ukulele, vocals
 Nicky Walusko – guitar, vocals 
 Probyn Gregory – guitar, horns, bass, tannerin, percussion, vocals
 Mike D'Amico – bass, drums, vocals
 Darian Sahanaja – keyboards, mallets, vocals
 Scott Bennett – keyboards, mallets, percussion, vocals
 Paul von Mertens – woodwinds
 Nelson Bragg – percussion, vocals
 John Cowsill – drums, vocals

Special Guest Appearances
 America
 Tim Bonhomme – keyboards
 Christopher Cross – vocals
 Bobby Figueroa – percussion (June 30)
 Foster the People
 Billy Hinsche – keyboards
 Adam Jardine – vocals 
 Matt Jardine – vocals 
 Ambha Love – vocals 
 Christian Love – vocals 
 Taylor Mills – vocals
 John Stamos – drums, percussion, guitar, vocals
 Dean Torrence – guitar, vocals
 Carl B. Wilson – vocals 
 Carnie Wilson – vocals 
 Justyn Wilson – vocals 
 Wendy Wilson – vocals 

 Nicky Walusko became ill part way through the tour and left.
 Members of California Saga, a group made up of the children of Beach Boys members Brian, Carl and Dennis Wilson, Mike Love and Al Jardine.

References

External links
 Official website

The Beach Boys
2012 concert tours
Reunion concert tours